Miankuh-e Moguyi Rural District is in the Central District of Kuhrang County, Chaharmahal and Bakhtiari province, Iran. At the census of 2006, its population was 3,781 in 624 households; there were 3,570 inhabitants in 754 households at the following census of 2011; and in the most recent census of 2016, the population of the rural district was 3,992 in 917 households. The largest of its 16 villages was Sar Aqa Seyyed, with 1,698 people.

Gallery

References 

Kuhrang County

Rural Districts of Chaharmahal and Bakhtiari Province

Populated places in Chaharmahal and Bakhtiari Province

Populated places in Kuhrang County